Sunder Lal Dixit (1942/1943 – 14 January 2023) was an Indian politician and member of the Bharatiya Janata Party. Dixit was a member of the Uttar Pradesh Legislative Assembly from the Haidergarh constituency in Barabanki district.

Dixit died on 14 January 2023, at the age of 80.

References 

1940s births
Year of birth missing
2023 deaths
People from Barabanki district
Bharatiya Janata Party politicians from Uttar Pradesh
Members of the Uttar Pradesh Legislative Assembly